Valfenera is a comune (municipality) in the Province of Asti in the Italian region Piedmont, located about  southeast of Turin and about  west of Asti.

Valfenera borders the following municipalities: Cantarana, Cellarengo, Dusino San Michele, Ferrere, Isolabella, Montà, and Villanova d'Asti.

References

Cities and towns in Piedmont